Anyetei "The Chameleon" Laryea (born 26 August 1978) is a Ghanaian professional super bantam/feather/super feather/lightweight boxer of the 1990s and 2000s who won the Ghanaian bantamweight title, West African Boxing Union bantamweight title, Ghanaian super bantamweight title, West African Boxing Union super bantamweight title, and Commonwealth super bantamweight title, and was a challenger for the African Boxing Union (ABU) bantamweight title against Friday Fatunji Felix, Commonwealth featherweight title against Nicky Cook, and World Boxing Association (WBA) Inter-Continental super bantamweight title against Gabula Vabaza, his professional fighting weight varied from , i.e. super bantamweight to , i.e. lightweight.

References

External links

1976 births
Bantamweight boxers
Featherweight boxers
Lightweight boxers
Living people
Place of birth missing (living people)
Super-featherweight boxers
Ghanaian male boxers
People from Tamale, Ghana